Jack Trehey (28 May 1882 – 5 December 1943) was an Australian rules footballer who played with Fitzroy and Essendon in the Victorian Football League (VFL).

Notes

External links 

1882 births
1943 deaths
Australian rules footballers from Melbourne
Fitzroy Football Club players
Essendon Football Club players
People from Carlton, Victoria